Tripuraneni Sai Chand (born 25 June 1956) is an Indian actor and documentary filmmaker who works in Telugu cinema, Telugu theatre, and television. He is popularly known for his roles in films like Maa Bhoomi, Fidaa and Sye raa Narasimha Reddy.

Early life
Tripuraneni Sai Chand was born to noted Telugu writer and humanist Tripuraneni Gopichand and is the grandson of Tripuraneni Ramaswamy. His father died when he was 6 years old. He completed his primary education from Vasavya Vidyalaya, Vijayawada run by Goparaju Ramachandra Rao. His first screen presence is in a film Sati Arundhati as a child actor. He did B.Com. from New Science College, Hyderabad.

Career
Maa Bhoomi (1980) directed by Goutam Ghose was Sai Chand's first film as an actor. His first film was box office hit and went to run for an year. It also received Nandi award, and Film Fare award in the best film category. It was also premiered in several film festivals across the world. 
He has acted in more than 35 films throughout his career. Sai Chand is commonly associated with parallel cinema like the films Maa Bhoomi, Manchupallaki, Pelleedu Pillalu, Ee Charitra Ae Siratho, Ee Desamlo Oka Roju, Rangula Kala, Adavallu Aligithe, Ee Chaduvulu Makkodu, Siva, Ankuram, Fidaa, 
Sye Raa Narasimha Reddy.

As a filmmaker, he made Pandita Parameshwara Sastry Veelunaamaa'' as a tele-film. Some of his documentaries are on topics that include: grain storage, dry-land agriculture, rice production technology, and information technology for common man.

Sai Chand has also made documentary films on film-making veterans like L. V. Prasad, Allu Ramalingaiah Singeetam Srinivasa Rao, Suryakantam, Anjali Devi, Bapu, Ramana Duo and others.

Filmography

References

External links
 

Indian male film actors
Living people
1956 births
Male actors in Telugu cinema
20th-century Indian male actors
21st-century Indian male actors
Indian documentary film directors
Indian experimental filmmakers
Male actors from Andhra Pradesh
People from Kurnool
People from Kurnool district
Telugu male actors